Destroy All Humans! is an open-world action-adventure video game series.

Destroy All Humans! may also refer to:

Destroy All Humans! (2005 video game), the first game in the series
Destroy All Humans! (2020 video game), a remake of the first game